Dubyaea is a genus of Asian flowering plants in the family Asteraceae, primarily from China.

 Species

Former species; Dubyaea amoena (Hand.-Mazz.) Stebbins and Dubyaea gombalana (Hand.-Mazz.) Stebbins

In 2021, molecular phylogeny on various species in Dubyaea, found that 2 species was separate from the rest of the genus. So the new genus of Lihengia was established with its species of Lihengia amoena (Hand.-Mazz.) Y.S.Chen & R.Ke and Lihengia gombalana (Hand.-Mazz.) Y.S.Chen & R.Ke.

References

Asteraceae genera
Cichorieae